Arthur Sewell (21 December 1903 – 9 February 1984) was a British athlete. He competed in the men's individual cross country event at the 1924 Summer Olympics.

References

External links
 

1903 births
1984 deaths
Athletes (track and field) at the 1924 Summer Olympics
British male long-distance runners
Olympic athletes of Great Britain
People from Bramley, Leeds
Olympic cross country runners